Moiseyevo is a rural locality (a selo) and the administrative center of Moiseyevskoye Rural Settlement, Kotovsky District, Volgograd Oblast, Russia. The population was 939 as of 2010. There are 14 streets.

Geography 
Moiseyevo is located in steppe, on Volga Upland, on the bank of the Bolshaya Kazanka River, 16 km southwest of Kotovo (the district's administrative centre) by road. Yefimovka is the nearest rural locality.

References 

Rural localities in Kotovsky District